Infra-Blue is the second studio album by guitarist Joey Tafolla, released in 1991 through Shrapnel Records.

Track listing

Personnel
Joey Tafolla – guitar
Kee Marcello – additional guitar solos (track 2)
Jesse Bradman – keyboard
Mike Mani – keyboard
Mark Robertson – keyboard
Deen Castronovo – drums
John Onder – bass
Steve Fontano – engineering, mixing, production
Mark "Mooka" Rennick – mixing
Joe Marquez – mixing assistance
Shawn Morris – engineering, mixing assistance
Paul Stubblebine – mastering
Mike Varney – production

References

External links
In Review: Joey Tafolla "Infra-Blue" at Guitar Nine Records

Joey Tafolla albums
1991 albums
Shrapnel Records albums
Albums produced by Mike Varney